Russula albonigra is a  member of the genus Russula, all of which are collectively known as brittlegills.

Taxonomy
First described by the mycologist Julius Vincenz von Krombholz in 1838, its specific epithet comes from Latin albus and niger, which mean white and black.

Description
The cap is convex to infundibuliform, whitish, sticky. The stipe is dusky, or white above, pale grey-ochreous towards the base. The gills are decurrent, crowded, thick, unequal, connected by veins, dusky whitish or yellowish. The flesh is white, turns black or sooty. The taste is somewhat bitter and unpleasant to mild.

See also
List of Russula species

References

albonigra